Payena kinabaluensis is a tree in the family Sapotaceae. Inflorescences bear up to seven flowers. The tree is named for Mount Kinabalu in Malaysia's Sabah state. Its habitat is mixed dipterocarp forest at about  altitude. P. kinabaluensis is endemic to Borneo and known only from Sabah.

References

kinabaluensis
Endemic flora of Borneo
Trees of Borneo
Flora of Sabah
Plants described in 1997